Swanee may refer to:

 Suwannee River, re-spelled "Swanee" by Stephen Foster to fit the rhythm in "Old Folks at Home", influencing subsequent uses of the word, such as:
 "Swanee" (song), a song by George Gershwin and Irving Caesar, made popular by Al Jolson
 Slide whistle, also called a swanee whistle
 Swanee, a soft drink made by the defunct Bob's-Cola company 
 Swanee (singer), the stage name of John Swan, an Australian rock singer

See also
 Sewanee (disambiguation)
 Suwanee (disambiguation)
 Suwannee (disambiguation)
 Swanee River (disambiguation)